Urmas or Ummi is an Estonian masculine given name. Notable people named Urmas include:

Urmas Alender (1953–1994), singer
Urmas Arumäe (born 1957), attorney, associate professor, former Minister of Justice
Urmas Espenberg (born 1961), author, politician and publicist
Urmas Hepner (born 1964), football player
Urmas Kaldvee (born 1961), biathlete
Urmas Kaljend (born 1964), football player
Urmas Kibuspuu (1953–1985), actor
Urmas Kirs (born 1966), football player and manager
Urmas Klaas (born 1971), politician
Urmas Kõljalg (born 1961), biologist, mycologist and university professor
Urmas Kruuse (born 1965), politician
Urmas Laht (born 1955), politician
Urmas Lattikas (born 1960), composer and jazz pianist
Urmas Eero Liiv (born 1966), film and television director
Urmas Lõoke (born 1950), architect
Urmas Muru (born 1961), architect and artist
Urmas Nigul (born 1965), military colonel
Urmas Ott (1955–2008), television and radio journalist
Urmas Paet (born 1974), politician
Urmas Reinsalu (born 1975), politician
Urmas Reitelmann (born 1958), radio and television personality, producer, journalist and politician
Urmas Rooba (born 1978), football player
Urmas Saaliste (born 1960), sport shooter 
Urmas Sisask (1960–2022), composer 
Urmas Sutrop (born 1956), linguist
Urmas Tali (born 1970), volleyball player and coach
Urmas Tartes (born 1963), biologist and photographer
Urmas Vadi (born 1977), writer, journalist and theatre director
Urmas Välbe (born 1966), cross-country skier
Urmas Viilma (born 1973), Estonian prelate, Archbishop of Tallinn, Primate of the Estonian Evangelical Lutheran Church

Estonian masculine given names